Nordberg is a surname. Notable people with the surname include:

Anders Nordberg (born 1978), Norwegian orienteering competitor
Bruno V. Nordberg (1857–1924), founder of Nordberg Manufacturing Company
Dan Nordberg, American politician
Erkki Nordberg(1946–2012), Finnish colonel
Frans Nordberg (1900–1984), Finnish canoer
Jenny Nordberg, New York-based, Swedish journalist
John Albert Nordberg (1926–2021), United States federal judge
Jöran Nordberg (1677–1744),  Swedish historian
Lars Nordberg (born 1982), Norwegian handball player
Nils Nordberg (born 1942), Norwegian crime writer, anthology editor and audio play director
Terje Nordberg (born 1949), Norwegian comics artist, comics writer and magazine editor

See also
Nordberg, neighbourhood in Nordre Aker in Oslo
Nordberg Manufacturing Company
Nordberg (station), station on the Sognsvann Line of the Oslo Metro in Oslo, Norway

References

Surnames of Scandinavian origin